This is the list of countries with participation in the Little League World Series.

Country Participants
As of the 2022 Little League World Series

International Finals

Since 1976, an international final has been played. The winner plays versus the US Champion for the LLWS title. In 2020, the entire LLWS tournament was cancelled due to the COVID-19 pandemic. The 2021 tournament will exclusively feature United States teams for the first time since 1975

As of the 2022 Little League World Series

Regional Appearances
Many countries have appeared and participated in little league baseball regional tournaments throughout history but have not yet appeared in the Little League World Series. Most of these countries still participate annually in the tournament while others no longer support little league programs. In bold 2022 participation.

Notes
 Zamboanga City, Philippines appeared in the 1992 Little League World Series, winning the championship, but were stripped of their title after the completion of the tournament when it was revealed that several players did not meet eligibility requirements regarding age and residency.
 Puerto Rico shares 1976 3rd place with Virginia. The game was canceled due to weather.
 Dominican Republic shares 1987 3rd place with Indiana. The game was canceled due to weather.
 Mexico shares 2006 3rd place with Oregon. The game was canceled due to weather.
 Mexico shares 2011 3rd place with Montana. The game was canceled due to Hurricane Irene.
 The 2020 Little League World Series was cancelled due to the COVID-19 pandemic
 The 2021 Little League World Series only featured United States teams for the first time since 1975. Two teams from each of the 8 U.S. regions participated in the World Series (regional champion and runner-up)
 The 2022 Little League World Series included the return of international teams and a tournament expansion which added four regions (Metro, Mountain, Panama, Puerto Rico)

References

appearances